Voronezh State Theater of Opera was founded in 1870 in Voronezh. It tours as the State Ballet Theater of Russia since 1961.

See also
Russian ballet

References

Voronezh
1870 establishments in the Russian Empire
1961 establishments in Russia
Ballet companies in Russia
Russian opera companies